William Gilbert Grace, commonly known as W. G. Grace, is generally considered one of the greatest cricketers of all time. His first-class cricket career spanned 44 seasons, from 1865 until 1908, during which time he claimed over 2,800 wickets and over 800 catches. Despite this, he is best known for his batting ability: possessing a "high backlift and willingness to play off both front and back foot", he stood apart from other batsmen of the time. He scored over 50,000 first-class runs, a feat achieved by only six other cricketers, and was the first cricketer to score 100 or more centuries.

Disputes regarding the first-class status of a number of matches in which W. G. Grace played have resulted in him having varying career statistics published. Of his centuries, 124 were scored in matches universally accepted as being first-class, these are the figures which are published on both Cricinfo and CricketArchive. A number of further matches are considered to be first-class by some sources; in these matches he scored two centuries: for the "Gentlemen to Canada Touring Team" against the Marylebone Cricket Club in 1873, and for Gloucestershire against Somerset in 1879. Grace, in his 1899 reminiscences, records both of these centuries among his tally of first-class centuries. In Wisden Cricketers' Almanacks first-class records section, he is listed as having scored 126 centuries, the eleventh most hundreds scored during a career. He retains this position with the lower total of 124, also appearing eleventh on Cricinfo's list.

Grace made his first-class debut in June 1865 appearing for the Gentlemen of the South against the Players of the South at The Oval, but did not score his first century until his tenth match, making an unbeaten 224 for England against Surrey County Cricket Club at the same ground. In 1871, he reached 100 on 10 different occasions, the most during any season of his career. In doing so, he became the first batsman to pass 2,000 first-class runs in a season, tallying 2,739 in total. He scored the first triple century in first-class cricket in 1876, amassing 344 for the Gentlemen of Marylebone Cricket Club against Kent after the Gentlemen had been forced to follow on. Less than two weeks later, Grace passed 300 once more, scoring 318 not out for Gloucestershire against Yorkshire. He scored 177 in his only innings between the two triple-centuries, and scored 839 runs in eight days.

He scored his 100th century in 1895; at the time this was reckoned to be made in the county match between Gloucestershire and Somerset. Somerset's captain, Sammy Woods recollects the moment in his reminiscences:
During May we had a weird game at Bristol v. Gloucester. We scored 200 for 1 wicket. W. G. then went on and took 5 wickets, and we were all out for 300. He then proceeded to go in first and help himself to 288, and to get his hundredth century. I had the satisfaction of giving him a full pitch to get to his hundred, not that he wanted any help.
Grace comments in his memoirs that he was glad to make his hundredth century at Gloucestershire's ground. Excluding the two centuries not considered first-class by some modern statisticians, Grace's hundredth century came later in the same month when he scored 169 for Gloucestershire against Middlesex at Lord's. He scored his final first-class century in July 1904 for London County, reaching 166 against the Marylebone Cricket Club. He played first-class cricket for another four seasons, and scored 15 and 25 for the Gentlemen of England in his final outing, an innings defeat against Surrey.

Key
 * denotes that he remained not out.
 Pos. denotes his position in the batting order.
 Inn. denotes the number of the innings in the match.
 Date denotes the date on which the match began.
 Drawn denotes that the match was drawn.
 Lost denotes that the match was lost by Grace's team.
 Won denotes that the match was won by Grace's team.
  denotes that the century was scored in a match not universally considered first-class.
  denotes that the century was scored in a Test match.

Centuries

References
General
 

Specific

Grace
W. G. Grace
Grace